Meslin is a surname. Notable people with the surname include:

Christophe Meslin (born 1977), French footballer
Michel Meslin (1926–2010), French academic
Dave Meslin, Canadian activist